Mark Thompson (born July 9, 1951) is a retired American professional stock car racing driver, pilot, and businessman. He formerly competed part-time in the Monster Energy NASCAR Cup Series, driving the No. 66 Ford Fusion for MBM Motorsports, and part-time in the NASCAR Xfinity Series, driving the No. 13 car for MBM Motorsports. At age 66, Thompson is the oldest driver to compete in the Daytona 500.

Military career and Phoenix Air

Thompson started flying in 1973 by transporting skydivers. Later in the decade, Thompson founded Phoenix Air as a parachuting school, which later evolved into an air transport company with ties to fifteen U.S. and foreign government agencies, carrying government workers who had been infected with diseases, including Americans who had contracted the Ebola virus disease from Liberia to the U.S. Phoenix Air also provides tactical electronic warfare training services to the Air Force, the Air National Guard and the Navy.

Phoenix Air currently sponsors MBM Motorsports' Nos. 13 and 40 cars in the Xfinity Series. In 2016, Phoenix served as a primary sponsor for MBM drivers Thompson, Carl Long and Timmy Hill.

Racing career

ARCA Racing Series

On November 28, 2016, MBM Motorsports announced plans for Thompson to race at the 2017 season-opening Lucas Oil 200 ARCA Racing Series race at Daytona; the race was Thompson's final planned ARCA start, though he would also compete at Talladega later in the season. Driving the No. 66 Phoenix Air Ford, Thompson qualified 15th, but finished 31st after he was collected in a nine-car accident on lap 49. In 2018, he returned again and raced in the Lucas Oil 200, though he was taken out in a violent late race crash.

NASCAR
In 1993 and 1994, Thompson made three NASCAR Winston Cup Series attempts with Henley Gray, driving the No. 62 and No. 86, respectively. He failed to qualify in his first attempt at Darlington Raceway, but made the second race at Pocono Raceway after qualifying 38th. However, after eight laps, he retired from the race due to an engine failure, and finished 39th. In 1993, Thompson failed to qualify for the Pepsi 400 after not making an attempt. The next year, he joined Mike Brandt in the No. 66 Ford, but withdrew from the Daytona 500.

In 2015, Thompson made his Xfinity Series debut in the Winn-Dixie 300 at Talladega Superspeedway, driving the No. 13 for MBM Motorsports, and qualified 31st, while finishing 27th, two laps down.

In 2017, Thompson joined Premium Motorsports to drive the No. 15 Chevrolet for the Alabama 500 at Talladega, Thompson's first Cup event in 25 years.

In 2018, Thompson raced in the 2018 Daytona 500 becoming the oldest driver at 66 years of age to drive in the event. He finished 22nd in what would become his final race in any series.

Personal life
Thompson's brother, Dent, was a writer at Walt Disney World until 1983, when he joined his brother at Phoenix Air; Dent currently works as Phoenix Air's COO.

Thompson holds an ATP license and has five type ratings.

Motorsports career results

NASCAR
(key) (Bold – Pole position awarded by qualifying time. Italics – Pole position earned by points standings or practice time. * – Most laps led.)

Monster Energy Cup Series

Daytona 500

Xfinity Series

 Season still in progress
 Ineligible for series points

ARCA Racing Series
(key) (Bold – Pole position awarded by qualifying time. Italics – Pole position earned by points standings or practice time. * – Most laps led.)

References

External links
 

Living people
1951 births
People from Cartersville, Georgia
NASCAR drivers
ARCA Menards Series drivers
Helicopter pilots
Racing drivers from Georgia (U.S. state)
20th-century American businesspeople
21st-century American businesspeople
Businesspeople from Georgia (U.S. state)
American chief operating officers
Sportspeople from the Atlanta metropolitan area